Conqueror Records was a United States-based record label, active from 1928 through 1942. The label was sold exclusively through Sears, Roebuck and Company.

History

Conqueror was originally owned by the Plaza Music Company, then became part of the American Record Corporation family of labels. Most of the issues are of standard dance tunes and popular songs of the era, although there are jazz recordings by Louis Armstrong and Glenn Miller.

The audio fidelity of Conquerors is average for the era, pressed into somewhat below average shellac. The record sleeves state that the proper playing speed for Conqueror Records is 80 rpm.

Selected artists

 Dick Messner
 Harry James
 Bing Crosby
 Fletcher Henderson
 Jack Pettis (de)
 Lizzie Miles
 Sam Lanin
 Devine's Wisconsin Roof Orchestra
 Fred Hall
 Ernie Golden
 Ted Wallace and his Orchestra
 Horsey's Hot Five
 Irving Mills
 Hal Kemp
 Fred Rich
 Duke Ellington
 Adrian Schubert
 Chick Bullock
 Ben Pollack
 Jack Teagarden
 Varsity Eight
 Cab Calloway
 Red Nichols
 Beale Street Washboard Band (see Herb Morand)
 ARC Studio Bands
 Gene Kardos
 Joe Haymes
 Dick Robertson

See also
 Embassy Records: Woolworth's store brand record label
 Oriole Records (U.S.): McCrory's store brand record label
 List of record labels

References

 Source for Selected Artists: Tom Lord (ed.), The Jazz Discography Online, Lord Music, (retrieved May 10, 2018; subscription required; accessible at many libraries);

External links
 Conqueror Records on the Internet Archive's Great 78 Project

American record labels
Record labels owned by Sears, Roebuck and Company
Jazz record labels
Record labels established in 1928
American companies established in 1928
Record labels disestablished in 1942